Mattancherry BOT Bridge, also known as Thoppumpady Bridge is a bridge in Kochi, Kerala, India. It connects the Kochi's western mainland to Willingdon Island. The new bridge was constructed in 1998; succeeding the old bridge of the same name, which is now known as the Old Cochin Harbour Bridge, built in 1940. The old bridge, which is a landmark of Kochi is now preserved as a heritage monument and carries only two and three wheelers.

The new Mattanchery bridge is the first Build-Operate-Transfer bridge in Kerala. It was built as a joint project of the Government of Kerala, the Greater Cochin Development Authority and Gammon India.

History
.
Sir Robert Bristow came to Kochi in 1920 as an engineer of the East India Company. On reaching, he prepared a project document for the development of Kochi port and informed it to the Governor of Madras, Lord Wellington. In three stages, an estuary 450 feet wide and three and a half miles long was formed connecting the deep sea and Cochin Bay and an area of 780 acres was developed from the lake using soil and the new man made island was named Wellington Island. Plans to build bridges to connect Wellington Island with Ernakulam and Mattancherry began in 1935. Following this, the old Mattanchery bridge was built across the backwater under the supervision of Robert Bristow to connect Willington island with Mattancherry. The bridge constructed from steel and timber was 486 meters long. Its construction was completed in 1938. It was built in such a way that the middle section was lifted up with a pulley and an iron rope so that the ships coming and going to the port would not be obstructed. A special spring technology has also been used for this. The middle span of the bridge is made of 16 spans and can be lifted using a pulley and an iron rope. Before raising the bridge, a warning was given on both sides of the bridge. Bristow convinced the skeptics of the reliability of the bridge by bringing elephants and made them walk over the bridge. The bridge was commissioned on 13 April 1943. As it resembles the British construction of bridge in London, locals call it as the London bridge of Kochi. A new bridge was constructed and opened in 1998 when the old bridge was found weaker to carry heavy vehicles. Upon the arrival of the new bridge, the old bridge was partially closed and presently only four wheelers, two wheelers and light motor vehicles are allowed to cross through it. The Old Harbour Bridge is now preserved as a heritage monument.

See also
 Venduruthy Bridge
 Goshree bridges
 History of Kochi
 Robert Bristow

References

Build–operate–transfer
Bridges in Kerala
Toll bridges in India
Transport in Kochi
Buildings and structures in Kochi
Public–private partnership projects in India
Mattancherry
Bridges completed in 1943
Bridges completed in 1998
1943 establishments in India
1998 establishments in Kerala
20th-century architecture in India